Admiral Sir Charles Carter Drury,  (27 August 1846 – 18 May 1914) was a Canadian-born senior of the Royal Navy who served as Second Sea Lord and Chief of Naval Personnel from 1903 to 1907.

Naval career
Born in Rothesay, New Brunswick, Drury was the son of LeBaron Drury (1813–1882), British Consul and High Sheriff of Saint John, New Brunswick, by his wife Eliza Sophia Poyntz, daughter of Colonel James Poyntz (1796–1887), of the 30th (Cambridgeshire) Regiment of Foot.

Drury joined the Royal Navy in 1860 and was made a sub-lieutenant in 1865. He was promoted to lieutenant in 1868, to commander in 1878 and to captain in 1885. Drury was appointed Commanding Officer of the battleship  in 1895.

Promoted to rear-admiral on 13 July 1899, Drury was appointed Commander-in-Chief, East Indies Station from June 1902. He served there during the January 1903 Delhi Durbar to commemorate the accession to the throne of King Edward VII, and was appointed a Knight Commander of the Order of the Star of India (KCSI) in the 1903 Durbar Honours. His time in the East Indies was cut short, however, as he was appointed Second Sea Lord and Chief of Naval Personnel from August 1903. He was promoted to vice admiral in 1904, and became Commander-in-Chief, Mediterranean Fleet from 1907 before being promoted to admiral and becoming Commander-in-Chief, The Nore in 1908. He retired in 1911.

Drury was Aide-de-camp to Queen Victoria from 1897 to 1899.

Family
Drury married Francis Ellen Whitehead, daughter of Robert Whitehead, of Beckett, Shrivenham, Berkshire. She died at the residence of her father on 22 February 1900.

His first cousin, Major General Charles William Drury, was the father of Lady Beaverbrook.

Arms

References

External links

|-

|-

|-

1846 births
1914 deaths
Canadian knights
Knights Commander of the Order of the Star of India
Knights Grand Cross of the Order of the Bath
Knights Grand Cross of the Royal Victorian Order
Lords of the Admiralty
People from Kings County, New Brunswick
Persons of National Historic Significance (Canada)